Sens Unik was a Swiss Hip hop group from Lausanne, which was founded in 1987 and disbanded in 2010.

Sens Unik received 4 gold records and contributed to music of films La Haine and Neutre.

The six members were: Just One, Carlos Leal, Rade, Déborah, Osez and Laurent Biollay.

Among their greatest successes was the 1997 published track "Original", which consists of a collaboration with the German hip-hop group Die Fantastischen Vier and had reached number 27 of the Swiss and number 73 of the German single charts. Several albums reached the top ten of the Swiss album charts.

For their song "Le vent tourne", released on the album Panorama 91-97, the group was inspired by the French film La Haine. The song also appeared on a special compilation for the film, La Haine, inspirée musique du film, but not on the soundtrack.

Discography

Albums and EPs 
 1991 – Le VIième Sens (EP)
 1992 – Les portes du temps (Album), CH#12
 1994 – Chromatic (Album), CH#4
 1996 – Tribulations (Album), CH#8
 1997 – Panorama 91-97 (Compilation-LP), CH#5
 1998 – Pole Position (Album), CH#9
 1999 – Propaganda Live (Live-Album), CH#26
 2001 – Abracadabra (Album), CH#12
 2004 – Mea culpa (Album), CH#8
 2004 – Galaxy 1991-2004 (Compilation-LP), CH#52
 2010 – Generations (Best-of-Album), CH#3

Singles 
 1991 – Nouvelle Politique (Maxi-Single)
 1992 – Rira bien (Maxi-Single)
 1992 – Hijo del Latino (Maxi-Single)
 1993 – À gauche, à droite (Maxi-Single)
 1994 – Laisse toi aller (Maxi-Single), CH#33
 1995 – What I've Got I&II (Maxi-Single) 
 1996 – Paquito (Maxi-Single), CH#45
 1997 – Original (feat. Fanta 4) (Maxi-Single), CH#27
 1998 – Zak et Loly (Maxi-Single), CH#32
 2001 – C'est la vie (Maxi-Single), CH#49
 2004 – Charly (Maxi-Single), CH#63
 2010 – Sur tes ondes, CH#66

References 

Swiss_hip_hop_groups